The short-limbed supple skink or Linnaeus's writhing skink (Lygosoma quadrupes) is a species of skink which is found widely in southern China, Hong Kong, and Southeast Asia (Thailand, Cambodia, Laos, Vietnam, West Malaysia, Indonesia (Sumatra, Java, Salayar), and the Philippines (Palawan, Calamian Islands)).

References

Lygosoma
Reptiles of Cambodia
Reptiles of China
Reptiles of Hong Kong
Reptiles of Indonesia
Reptiles of Laos
Reptiles of Malaysia
Reptiles of the Philippines
Reptiles of Thailand
Reptiles of Vietnam
Reptiles described in 1766
Taxa named by Carl Linnaeus